Atomic 7 was a Canadian instrumental rock trio formed in 1998, and led by its only constant member, former Shadowy Men on a Shadowy Planet guitarist Brian Connelly. 

Atomic 7's music is completely instrumental; the band didn't even use vocal microphones on stage. According to one reviewer, "Every album contains about a 50/50 mix of country/swing and spaghetti western/surf/spy tunes." The band's most recent line-up was Brian Connelly on guitar, Mark Duff on drums and Brad Keogan on bass.

History
Their debut album, Gowns by Edith Head was released in January 2003, and featured Brian Connelly on guitar, Clinton Ryder on double bass and Mike Andreosso on drums. 

That album was followed by ...En Hillbilly Caliente in June 2004, with Mandi Bird taking over for Ryder on bass.

In February 2007, the band released their third and final album ... Something For The Girl With Everything.

Discography

Singles
"She's Got Haggar Party Slacks / I Regret Nothing" (1998), Eleganza Records

Albums
... Gowns By Edith Head (2002), Mint Records
... en Hillbilly Caliente (2004), Mint Records
... Something For The Girl With Everything (2007), Eleganza Records

References

External links
Atomic 7 at Mint Records (label bio)
Atomic 7 on CBC Music
The Shadowy Site On A Shadowy Web (Unofficial Shadowy Men Home Page with a section on Atomic 7)

Musical groups established in 1998
Musical groups from Toronto
Canadian rock music groups
Mint Records artists
Surf music groups
1998 establishments in Ontario
Canadian instrumental musical groups